1661 Granule, also designated , is a stony Florian asteroid from the inner regions of the asteroid belt, approximately 7 kilometers in diameter. It was discovered on 31 March 1916, by German astronomer Max Wolf at Heidelberg Observatiry in southern Germany, and named for American pathologist Edward Gall.

Classification and orbit 

The S-type asteroid is a member of the Flora family, a large collisional population of stony asteroids in the inner main-belt. It orbits the Sun at a distance of 2.0–2.4 AU once every 3 years and 3 months (1,179 days). Its orbit has an eccentricity of 0.09 and an inclination of 3° with respect to the ecliptic. Granules observation arc begins with its observation at Bergedorf Observatory, one month after its official discovery observation. (It is unclear whether "HD 17", Message from Heidelberg Observatory #17, is the official discovery observation due to a different time stamp).

Physical characteristics

Rotation period 

In January 2006, the first rotational light-curve of Granule was obtained from photometric observations by French amateur astronomer René Roy. It gave a longer-than average rotation period of 24 hours with a brightness variation of 0.15 magnitude. No other light-curves have been obtained yet.

Size estimates 

Granule has neither been observed by the Infrared Astronomical Satellite IRAS, nor the Japanese Akari satellite, nor NASA's Wide-field Infrared Survey Explorer with its subsequent NEOWISE mission. The Collaborative Asteroid Lightcurve Link assumes an albedo of 0.24 – derived from the family's principal body and namesake, the asteroid 8 Flora – and calculates a diameter of 7.14 kilometers using an absolute magnitude of 12.9.

Naming 

This minor planet was named in honor of Edward A. Gall, an internationally renowned American pathologist, former director of the University of Cincinnati Academic Health Center and president of USCAP. It was named on the occasion of his retirement to commemorate his career and his discovery of the Gall's granule, a feature of lymphocytes. The official  was published by the Minor Planet Center on 20 December 1974.

References

External links 
 Asteroid Lightcurve Database (LCDB), query form (info )
 Dictionary of Minor Planet Names, Google books
 Asteroids and comets rotation curves, CdR – Observatoire de Genève, Raoul Behrend
 Discovery Circumstances: Numbered Minor Planets (1)-(5000) – Minor Planet Center
 
 

001661
Discoveries by Max Wolf
Named minor planets
19160331